Unlivable is an American television series airing on the Fyi network. The show features April "Bama" Glover and Gary Stein working together to makeover houses across America.

Broadcast
The eight episode series premiered in the U.S. on the Fyi network on October 15, 2014.

Internationally, the series premiered in Australia on May 1, 2015 on LifeStyle Home.

Episodes

References

External links

2010s American reality television series
2014 American television series debuts
English-language television shows